Berkeley, Virginia may refer to:
Berkeley, Albemarle County, Virginia
Berkeley, Charles City County, Virginia
Berkeley Plantation, namesake of the community

See also
Berkley, Virginia, a former town that is now part of Norfolk